Atalacmea is a genus of sea snails or true limpets, marine gastropod molluscs in the family Lottiidae, one of the families of true limpets.

Species
Species within the genus Atalacmea include:
 Atalacmea elata Marwick, 1928 †
 Atalacmea fragilis (Sowerby I, 1823)
 Atalacmea multilinea Powell, 1934

References

 Powell A. W. B., New Zealand Mollusca, William Collins Publishers Ltd, Auckland, New Zealand 1979

External links
 Iredale T. (1915). A commentary on Suter's Manual of the New Zealand Mollusca. Transactions and Proceedings of the New Zealand Institute. 47: 417-497

Lottiidae
Gastropods of New Zealand
Gastropod genera